The Jardine Juniper is an individual of the species Rocky Mountain juniper found within Logan Canyon in the Cache National Forest. Often credited with an age of over 3,000 years, core samples taken in the 1950s revealed that it was around 1,500 years old. Discovered in 1923 by Maurice Blood Linford while he was a student at Utah State Agricultural College (USAC), it was named after USAC alumnus and former U.S. Secretary of Agriculture William Marion Jardine (1879–1955).

See also
 List of oldest trees
 List of individual trees

References

External links 
 Flickr photos tagged "jardine juniper"

Individual conifers
Juniperus
Juniperus
Individual trees in Utah
Oldest trees